United We Stand: What More Can I Give was a benefit concert led by Michael Jackson held on October 21, 2001, at RFK Stadium in Washington, D.C. The concert was the third major concert held in tribute to the victims of the September 11 attacks. The other two were held in New York City. The special premiered on ABC on Thursday, November 1, 2001.

Background 
After he completed his 30th-anniversary special concert tour with his brothers at Madison Square Garden, Jackson was originally supposed to attend a meeting at the World Trade Center on September 11, 2001, but overslept and did not attend. He organized the benefit concert as a response.

Performances
The concert was a half-day-long spectacle beginning in the early afternoon and lasting well into the night. Performers ranged from music icons including Mariah Carey, James Brown, Al Green, Carole King, Rod Stewart, Bette Midler, America, and Huey Lewis to starting stars of that time including Destiny's Child, P. Diddy, the Goo Goo Dolls, Train, Backstreet Boys, Usher, Pink, and NSYNC. Each performer did a brief set usually amounting to about five songs apiece.

In order, the performances were: Backstreet Boys, Krystal Harris, Huey Lewis and the News, James Brown, Billy Gilman, O-Town, Usher, Christina Milian, Carole King, Al Green, Pink, Bette Midler, CeCe Peniston, Aerosmith, America, P. Diddy (with Faith Evans singing backup in the choir), NSYNC, Janet Jackson, Destiny's Child, Rod Stewart, Goo Goo Dolls, Train, Mariah Carey, and Michael Jackson, who performed "Man in the Mirror". Then everyone joined together, including MC Hammer and Mýa, for closing the show by performing "What More Can I Give".

Notable appearances were given by Aerosmith, who performed at the festival as well as a scheduled concert in Indianapolis on the same night, while Backstreet Boys, Destiny's Child, and the Goo Goo Dolls had performed the previous night at The Concert for New York City.

Issues 
The event was plagued with problems, such as guests that did not show up (including Mick Jagger, Kiss, Ricky Martin, Aaron Carter and MC Hammer), faulty sound equipment, and concessionaires running out of food and beverages.

Television broadcast 
Several days after the event, ABC aired a condensed, two-hour version of the concert as a special. Due to an exclusivity agreement with CBS for an upcoming special drawn from the 30th anniversary concerts, Jackson's solo performance of "Man in the Mirror" was removed from the ABC broadcast at the request of his management. The finale which incorporated Jackson was still allowed to air.

Host and special appearances 
John Stamos hosted the event, and appearances were also made by celebrities including Kevin Spacey along with political figures such as the mayor of Washington, D.C.

Set list 

 Backstreet Boys
 "The Star-Spangled Banner" (broadcast on ABC)
 "Everyone"
 "I Want It That Way"
 "More Than That"
 "The Answer to Our Life"
 "Shape of My Heart" (broadcast on ABC)
 "Drowning"
 Krystal Harris
 "Supergirl"
 Huey Lewis and the News
 "The Heart of Rock & Roll"
 "Perfect World"
 "The Power Of Love"
 "Workin' for a Livin'"
 James Brown
 "Living in America"
 "The Popcorn/School Is In"
 "I Feel Good"
 "Sex Machine"
 "God Bless America"
 Billy Gilman
 "One Voice"
 O-Town
 "All Or Nothing"
 Usher
 "U Remind Me"
 Christina Milian
 "AM to PM"
 Carole King
 "So Far Away"
 "Love Makes The World"
 "Monday Without You"
 Al Green
 "Let's Stay Together"
 "Amazing Grace/Together (reprise)"
 "Take Me To The River"
 Pink
 "My Vietnam" 
 "Me and Bobby McGee"
 Bette Midler
 "From A Distance"
 "Boogie Woogie Bugle Boy"
 "The Rose"

 CeCe Peniston
 "Finally"
 Aerosmith
 "Livin' on the Edge" (broadcast on ABC)
 "I Don't Want to Miss a Thing" (broadcast on ABC)
 "Just Push Play" (broadcast on ABC)
 "Walk This Way" (broadcast on ABC)
 America
 "Ventura Highway"
 "Sister Golden Hair"
 P. Diddy
 "Bad Boy For Life"
 "Been Around The World" 
 "It's All About The Benjamins"
 "Come With Me" (broadcast on ABC)
 "Mo Money Mo Problems"
 "I'll Be Missing You" (broadcast on ABC)
 NSYNC
 "Pop"
 "Tearin' Up My Heart"
 "This I Promise You"
 "Bye Bye Bye"
 Janet Jackson
 "All For You"
 Destiny's Child
 "Survivor" (broadcast on ABC)
 "Emotion" (broadcast on ABC)
 "Gospel Medley"
 Rod Stewart
 "Hot Legs" (broadcast on ABC)
 "Forever Young" (broadcast on ABC)
 "Rhythm of My Heart" (broadcast on ABC)
 Goo Goo Dolls
 "Slide"
 "Iris" (broadcast on ABC)
 "American Girl" (broadcast on ABC)
 Train
 "Meet Virginia" (broadcast on ABC)
 "Drops Of Jupiter"
 Mariah Carey
 "Never Too Far/Hero" (broadcast on ABC)
 "Last Night a DJ Saved My Life" (broadcast on ABC)
 Michael Jackson
 "Man in the Mirror"
 "What More Can I Give" (broadcast on ABC)

Date

See also
 America: A Tribute to Heroes
 The Concert for New York City

References

2001 in American music
2001 in Washington, D.C.
Aftermath of the September 11 attacks
Benefit concerts in the United States
Michael Jackson concerts
Music television specials